Lycia is a former geopolitical region in Anatolia.

Lycia may also refer to:

Species
 Lycia (moth), a genus of moths in the family Geometridae
 Lycia (butterfly), an invalid name for the butterfly genus Lycaena

People
 Lycia Naff (born 1962), American actress and journalist
 Lycia Trouton, artist from Northern Ireland

Other
 Lycia (band), a dark wave band
 The League of Lycia, a fictional confederation of states from the video game Fire Emblem
 Lycia, Cunard cargo ship;

See also
 Lycian (disambiguation)